The  is a people mover system at Kansai International Airport in Osaka, Japan. The system opened on 4 September 1994, with the opening of the airport itself. The driverless people mover lines link the main terminal building and the tips of two wings. All the stations are equipped with platform screen doors.

After the Narita Airport Terminal 2 Shuttle System was decommissioned in 2013, this is the only airport people mover in Japan.

Lines and stations 
There are two lines, each running on the North Wing and the South Wing. Both lines have two services; one each terminates at midways, another each terminates at tips. Stations of two lines share same names, although all of them are different stations.

Trains stop at stations signed "+", skip at "-".

See also 
 List of airport people mover systems
 People mover

External links 
  Wing Shuttle, from Kansai International Airport official website
  International Departure Procedures, from Kansai International Airport official website
  Wing Shuttle, from the official website of Niigata-Transys, the car manufacturer.

Airport people mover systems
People mover systems in Japan
1994 establishments in Japan